Muravli is a rural locality (a khutor) in Malodelskoye Rural Settlement, Frolovsky District, Volgograd Oblast, Russia. The population was 1 as of 2010.

Geography 
Muravli is located 71 km northeast of Prigorodny (the district's administrative centre) by road. Malodelskaya is the nearest rural locality.

References 

Rural localities in Frolovsky District